Lulu Huang Lu Zi Yin (born 24 April 1991) is a Taiwanese television host, singer and actress. She is of Atayal descent, Lu being her original surname and Huang Lu as her official aboriginal family name. She first became known for her impressions of host Matilda Tao on the show University. She has since hosted numerous variety shows and award shows in Taiwan. She made her debut as a singer in 2016.

Personal life 
She was in a relationship with her iWalker co-host A Da from 2013 to 2019.

Selected filmography

Variety show

Event

Television series

Film

Music video appearances

Discography

Studio albums

Extended plays

Collaborative singles

Theater

Awards and nominations

References

External links

 
 

1991 births
Living people
Taiwanese television presenters
Taiwanese women television presenters
Actresses from Taichung
Musicians from Taichung
National Taiwan University of Arts alumni
21st-century Taiwanese singers
21st-century Taiwanese actresses
Taiwanese stage actresses
Taiwanese women singers
Atayal people